Lyman Hall (April 12, 1724 – October 19, 1790) was an American Founding Father, physician, clergyman, and statesman who signed the United States Declaration of Independence as a representative of Georgia. Hall County is named after him. He was one of four physicians to sign the Declaration, along with Benjamin Rush, Josiah Bartlett, and Matthew Thornton.

Early life and family 

Hall was born on April 12, 1724, in Wallingford, Connecticut. He was the son of John Hall, a minister, and Mary (née Street) Hall. He studied with his uncle Samuel Hall and graduated from Yale College in 1747, a tradition in his family. In 1749, he was called to the pulpit of Stratfield Parish (now Bridgeport, Connecticut). His pastorate was a stormy one: an outspoken group of parishioners opposed his ordination; in 1751, he was dismissed after charges against his moral character which, according to one biography, "Were supported by proof and also by his own confession." He continued to preach for two more years, filling vacant pulpits, while he studied medicine and taught school.

In 1752, he married Abigail Burr of Fairfield, Connecticut; she died the following year. In 1757, he married Mary Osborne. He migrated to South Carolina and established himself as a physician at Dorchester, South Carolina, near Charleston, a community settled by Congregationalist migrants from Dorchester, Massachusetts, decades earlier. When these settlers moved to the Midway Districtnow Liberty Countyin Georgia, Hall accompanied them. Hall soon became one of the leading citizens of the newly founded town of Sunbury.

Revolutionary War 
On the eve of the American Revolution, St. John's Parish, in which Sunbury was located, was a hotbed of radical sentiment in a predominantly Loyalist colony. Though Georgia was not initially represented in the First Continental Congress, through Hall's influence the parish was persuaded to send a delegate to Philadelphia to the Second Continental Congress. Hall was delegated and was admitted to a seat in the Congress in 1775. He was one of the three Georgians and one of four doctors to sign the Declaration of Independence.

In January 1779, Sunbury was burned by the British. Hall's family fled to the North, where they remained until the British evacuation in 1782. Hall then returned to Georgia, settling in Savannah. In January 1783, he was elected governor of the statea position that he held for one year. While governor, Hall advocated the chartering of a state university, believing that education, particularly religious education, would result in a more virtuous citizenry. His efforts led to the chartering of the University of Georgia in 1785. At the expiration of his term as governor, he resumed his medical practice.

Death and legacy 
In 1790, Hall moved to a plantation in Burke County, Georgia, on the South Carolina border, where he died on October 19 at the age of 66. Hall's widow died in November 1793.

Lyman Hall is memorialized in Georgia where Hall County, Georgia, bears his name; and in Connecticut, his native state, where the town of Wallingford honored him by naming a high school after its distinguished native son. Elementary schools in Liberty County, Georgia, and in Hall County, Georgia, are also named for him. Signers Monument, a granite obelisk in front of the courthouse in Augusta, Georgia, memorializes Hall along with Button Gwinnett and George Walton as Georgians who signed the Declaration of Independence. His remains were re-interred there in 1848 after being exhumed from his original grave on his plantation in Burke County.

See also

 Memorial to the 56 Signers of the Declaration of Independence
Founding Fathers of the United States

Notes

References

Further reading

External links 

Lyman Hall, The Society of the Descendants of the Signers of the Declaration of Independence
Lyman Hall historical marker

1724 births
1790 deaths
Continental Congressmen from Georgia (U.S. state)
18th-century American politicians
Governors of Georgia (U.S. state)
Signers of the United States Declaration of Independence
American people of English descent
People of Georgia (U.S. state) in the American Revolution
People from Wallingford, Connecticut
Yale University alumni
University of Georgia
American Congregationalists
American slave owners
Independent state governors of the United States
Georgia (U.S. state) Independents
People from Liberty County, Georgia
Physicians from Connecticut
Physicians from Georgia (U.S. state)
18th-century American physicians
Founding Fathers of the United States